The Parti marxiste–léniniste du Québec fielded twenty-five candidates in the 2012 provincial election, none of whom were elected.

Candidates

Source: Résultats, Élections générales (2012, 4 septembre), Le Directeur général des élections du Québec, accessed 14 November 2012.

Footnotes

Candidates in Quebec provincial elections
Quebec 2012